The Church of Scientology officially denies that it uses hypnosis as part of its beliefs and practices. Individuals admitting to having had hypnosis, as either a participant or practitioner, are not permitted to undergo training due to the possibility of harm caused by the prior exposure to hypnosis.  Scientology has, nonetheless, been subject throughout its history to accusations that it covertly uses hypnosis to gain control over its members.

Hubbard's experience with hypnosis
Scientology founder L. Ron Hubbard was known to his associates in the late 1940s as a talented hypnotist.
During this period, he worked in Hollywood posing as a swami.
The Church says that Hubbard's experience with hypnosis led him to create Dianetics as an alternative means to solve man's problems.

Scientology official statements on hypnosis 
The Church of Scientology's official position on hypnosis is that it is a dangerous and undesirable practice. Whereas hypnotism's goal is to place a person in "a state of lessened awareness (i.e. trance)", Scientology's stated goal is to put people into the opposite state - one of higher awareness.

Controversy
Margery Wakefield, in her book Understanding Scientology, claimed that the extremely repetitive questioning done during drills in Scientology auditing was a form of hypnosis. She claimed that these drills are sometimes done for several hours at a time, "until the preclear can do it without delay, without protest, without apathy, but with cheerfulness."

In his book The Creation of Human Ability, Hubbard denied the hypnotic nature of the processes and drills. He stated: "(They) induce no trances. People who think so simply don't know much about hypnotism."

A 2005 article in the Miami Herald quoted Scientology critic David Touretzky as saying "It's very clear that what they're doing is putting people into a light trance".

A 2010 article in Ynet quoted Dr. Alex Aviv, Chairman of the Advisory Committee on the Law of Hypnosis to the Israeli Ministry of Health as saying (in reference to Scientology) "they restore early memories, usually of traumas, when in some cases this is a false memory. When a patient 'remembers' a false event like that via a hypnotic process - the event can become real for him".

Volney Mathison, an early collaborator with Hubbard who designed the precursor machine to the e-meter, remarked in 1964, "I decry the doings of trivial fakers, such as scientologists and the like, who glibly denounce hypnosis and then try covertly to use it in their phony systems".

See also
Scientology and the occult
Training routines (Scientology)

References

External links
 Lee Report on Hypnosis and Scientology

Hypnosis
Hypnosis
Hypnosis